Akdere (Laz language: Zendidi) is a village in the Kemalpaşa District, Artvin Province, Turkey. Its population is 126 (2021).

References

Villages in Kemalpaşa District